The Fuji T-7 (previously T-3 Kai) is a Japanese primary trainer aircraft built by Fuji Heavy Industries for the Japan Air Self-Defense Force. A development of Fuji's earlier T-3 trainer, it is a single-engined monoplane powered by a turboprop engine.

Design and development

The Fuji T-7 was developed to meet a requirement of Japan's Air Self Defence Force for a primary or basic trainer to replace the Fuji T-3.  The resultant aircraft was a modified version of the T-3, (itself descended via the Fuji KM-2 from the Beech T-34) and shared the single-engined low-winged monoplane layout of the T-3, but replaced the Lycoming piston engine with an Allison 250 turboprop engine.

The T-7 was selected in preference to the Pilatus PC-7 in 1998, but this decision was cancelled and the competition restarted after a corruption scandal arose, with several managers from Fuji being arrested for bribing an official in Japan's ruling Liberal Democratic Party. Fuji re-entered the T-7 (then known as the T-3 Kai) and again won the restarted competition in September 2000.

Operational history
The first production aircraft was handed over to the JASDF in September 2002.

Operators

 Japan Air Self-Defense Force
 Air Training Command:
 11th Flight Training Wing
 1st Flight Training Squadron
 2nd Flight Training Squadron
 12th Flight Training Wing (2005-)
 1st Flight Training Squadron (2005-)
 2nd Flight Training Squadron (2005-)
 Air Development and Test Command
 Air Development and Test Wing

Specifications (T-7)

See also

References

Bibliography
 Jeziorski, Andrzej. "T-3 replacement battle re-opens". Flight International, 28 March – 3 April 2000, p. 20.
 Mollet, Andrew. "Japan's T-7 decision saves Fuji's day". Flight International, 9–15 September 1998, p. 31.
 Ripley, Tim. "Military Aircraft Directory". Flight International, 25–31 May 2004, p. 38–73.

Further reading
 Sobie, Brendan. "Japan's pilots to start T-7 training early next year". Flight International, 12 August 2003.

External links

 Globalsecurity.com
 Photo

T-7
2000s Japanese military trainer aircraft
Single-engined tractor aircraft
Low-wing aircraft
Single-engined turboprop aircraft
Aircraft first flown in 2002